Greensword is a common name for several Hawaiian plants in the genus Argyroxiphium, and may refer to:

Argyroxiphium grayanum, endemic to Maui
Argyroxiphium virescens, an extinct plant endemic to Maui